Édes Anna is a 1958 Hungarian drama film directed by Zoltán Fábri. It was entered into the 1959 Cannes Film Festival.

Cast
 Mari Törőcsik – Édes Anna
 Mária Mezei – Vízyné
 Károly Kovács – Vízy Kornél
 Zsigmond Fülöp – Jancsi
 Béla Barsi – Ficsor
 Anna Báró – Tatárné
 Kati Böröndi – Katica
 Zoltán Greguss – Tatár Gábor
 Hilda Gobbi – Etel
 János Horkay – Druma (as János Horkai)
 György Kálmán
 Zoltán Makláry – Dr. Moviszter
 Gellért Raksányi – Báthory
 Erzsi Simor – Moviszterné
 Viktória Ujváry – (as Újvári Viktória)
 Éva Vadnai – Drumáné

References

External links

1958 films
1950s Hungarian-language films
1958 drama films
Hungarian black-and-white films
Films directed by Zoltán Fábri